The 1975–76 season was Chelsea Football Club's sixty-second competitive season.

Table

References

External links
 1975–76 season at stamford-bridge.com

1975–76
English football clubs 1975–76 season